Phylactery originally referred to tefillin, leather boxes containing Torah verses worn by some Jews when praying.

In Mandaeism, some different types of phylacteries are known as zrazta and qmaha, a list of which can be found at list of Mandaean texts.

Phylactery may also refer to:

Other religious or superstitious beliefs 
 An amulet or charm, worn for its supposed magical or supernatural power
 A reliquary, a case in which (Christian) relics were preserved

Other uses 
 A speech scroll in Mesoamerican or medieval European art, which contains or represents speech
 Phylactery (Dungeons & Dragons), an object used to store a monster's soul to protect it from death as introduced by the Dungeons & Dragons role-playing game and now ubiquitous within fantasy fiction
 Phylactery Factory, the second album by American singer-songwriter Casey Dienel, but the first under the White Hinterland name

See also 
 Hunping, a type of Chinese funerary urn also known as a soul jar

Amulets
Objects believed to protect from evil
Practical Kabbalah
Talismans